The Sonata in B-flat major for piano four-hands, D 617 (Op. 30) by Franz Schubert, is the first of two sonatas for two pianists the composer wrote in his lifetime, the other being the Grand Duo of 1824.

History

Schubert wrote this work in the summer of 1818 while at Zseliz on the Esterházy estate, probably for the two countesses he was tutoring at the time. It was one of a number of works for piano four-hands he composed while residing there.

The work was published in 1823 as the composer's Op. 30 with a dedication to Count Ferdinand Palffy d'Erdöd, proprietor of the Theater an der Wien. Max Harrison speculates that the dedication may have been connected with the performances of Rosamunde that took place there in the same year.

Structure

The work is in three movements:

References 
Notes

Sources

External links
 
 

Piano sonatas by Franz Schubert
Compositions for piano four-hands
1818 compositions
Compositions in B-flat major
Music dedicated to nobility or royalty